Klein Constantia was a UCI Continental cycling team based in the Czech Republic and a development squad for UCI World Tour team Etixx–Quick-Step. It was set up by Patrick Lefevere in 2013.

The team was initially sponsored by Etixx, Belgian producer of supplements and nutrition products, owned by Omega Pharma, and iHNed.cz, Czech news portal, operated by Economia, Czech media company owned by Zdeněk Bakala, who owns Etixx–Quick-Step team. In 2014 Etixx became only sponsor. Since season 2015 , Czech transport company, owned by Bakala, and Slovakian electric vehicle charging company, took over as title sponsors. The squad has been rebuilt with only two riders staying on board and 10 new young joining the team. In 2016, the South African wine making company Klein Constantia, owned by Zdeněk Bakala, became title sponsor.

Team roster

Major wins

2013
 U23 National Cyclo-cross Championships, Julian Alaphilippe
Stage 1 Boucle de l'Artois, Louis Verhelst
Stage 1 Circuit des Ardennes, Louis Verhelst
Stage 1 Tour de Bretagne, Louis Verhelst
Stage 4 Tour de Bretagne, Julian Alaphilippe
Grand Prix Südkärnten, Julian Alaphilippe
 Overall Okolo Slovenska, Petr Vakoč
Stage 1 Thüringen Rundfahrt der U23, Łukasz Wiśniowski
Stage 3 Thüringen Rundfahrt der U23, Julian Alaphilippe
 U23 National Road Race Championships, Łukasz Wiśniowski
 U23 National Time Trial Championships, Łukasz Wiśniowski
 Overall Vuelta a la Comunidad de Madrid Sub 23, Petr Vakoč
Stage 1, Petr Vakoč
Stage 4 Czech Cycling Tour, Petr Vakoč
Memoriał Henryka Łasaka, Florian Sénéchal
Grand Prix Královéhradeckého kraje, Petr Vakoč
 Overall Okolo Jižních Čech, Florian Sénéchal
Stage 2, Florian Sénéchal
2014
Kattekoers, Łukasz Wiśniowski
Stage 4 Tour de Normandie, Łukasz Wiśniowski
Stage 4 Volta ao Alentejo, Karel Hník
 Overall Circuit des Ardennes, Łukasz Wiśniowski
Stage 5 Tour de Bretagne, Daniel Hoelgaard
 Overall Course de la Paix U23, Samuel Spokes
Stages 2 & 3, Samuel Spokes
Stage 2 Ronde de l'Oise, Daniel Hoelgaard
 U23 National Road Race Championships, Tim Kerkhof
Stage 3 Troféu Joaquim Agostinho, Karel Hník
Stage 3 Czech Cycling Tour, Jan Hirt
 Overall Tour Alsace, Karel Hník
Stage 4, Karel Hník
Stages 1 & 4 Okolo Jižních Čech, Daniel Hoelgaard
2015
Prologue Carpathian Couriers Race, Jan Brockhoff
Stage 4 Carpathian Couriers Race, Erik Baška
Stage 3 Tour de Berlin, Erik Baška
 U23 National Time Trial Championships, Erik Baška
 U23 National Road Race Championships, Erik Baška
Puchar Ministra Obrony Narodowej, Erik Baška
2016
 U23 National Road Race Championships, Hamish Schreurs
Trofej Umag, Jonas Bokeloh
 Overall Volta ao Alentejo, Enric Mas
Stage 2, Enric Mas
Stage 5, Rémi Cavagna
Stage 1 Circuit des Ardennes, Rémi Cavagna
Stage 1 Tour de Bretagne, František Sisr
 Overall Carpathian Couriers Race, Hamish Schreurs
Prologue & Stage 3, Hamish Schreurs
 Overall Tour de Berlin, Rémi Cavagna
Stage 3a (ITT), Rémi Cavagna
 U23 National Time Trial Championships, Jhonatan Narváez
Stage 3 Paris–Arras Tour, Rémi Cavagna
 Overall Tour de Savoie Mont-Blanc, Enric Mas
 U23 National Time Trial Championships, Michal Schlegel
 U23 National Time Trial Championships, Max Schachmann
Stage 4 Course de Solidarność et des Champions Olympiques, Iván García Cortina
Stage 3 Giro della Valle d'Aosta, Max Schachmann
 Overall Tour Alsace, Max Schachmann
Stage 3, Max Schachmann
 U23 National Time Trial Championships, Rémi Cavagna
Stage 1 East Bohemia Tour, František Sisr

National champions
2013
 France U23 Cyclo-cross, Julian Alaphilippe
 Poland U23 Road Race, Łukasz Wiśniowski
 Poland U23 Time Trial, Łukasz Wiśniowski
2014
 Netherlands U23 Road Race, Tim Kerkhof
2015
 Slovakia U23 Time Trial, Erik Baška
 Slovakia U23 Road Race, Erik Baška
2016
 New Zealand U23 Road Race, Hamish Schreurs
 Ecuador U23 Time Trial, Jhonatan Narváez
 Czech U23 Time Trial, Michal Schlegel
 Germany U23 Time Trial, Maximilian Schachmann
 France U23 Time Trial, Rémi Cavagna

References

UCI Continental Teams (Europe)
Cycling teams based in the Czech Republic
Cycling teams established in 2013
Cycling teams disestablished in 2016